Thomas Dongan, (pronounced "Dungan") 2nd Earl of Limerick (1634 – 14 December 1715), was a member of the Irish Parliament, Royalist military officer during the English Civil War, and Governor of the Province of New York. He is noted for having called the first representative legislature in New York, and for granting the province's Charter of Liberties.

Biography

Early life
He was born in 1634 into an old Gaelic Norman (Irish Catholic) family in Castletown Kildrought (now Celbridge), County Kildare, in the Kingdom of Ireland, the seventh and youngest son of Sir John Dongan, 2nd Baronet, Member of the Irish Parliament, and his wife Mary Talbot, daughter of Sir William Talbot, 1st Baronet, and Alison Netterville. As Stuart supporters, after the overthrow of King Charles I, the family went to King Louis XIV's France, although they managed to hold on to at least part of their Irish estates. His family gave their name to the Dongan Dragoons, a premier military regiment.

Career
While in France, he served in an Irish regiment with Turenne. He stayed in France after the Restoration and achieved the rank of colonel in 1674.

After the Treaty of Nijmegen ended the French-Dutch War in 1678, Dongan returned to England in obedience to the order that recalled all English subjects fighting in service to France. Fellow officer James, Duke of York, arranged to have him granted a high-ranking commission in the army designated for service in Flanders and a pension. That same year, he was appointed Lieutenant-Governor of Tangiers, which had been granted to England as part of the dowry of Catherine of Braganza. He served as part of the Tangier Garrison which defended the settlement.

Governor of New York
In September 1682, James, Duke of York, as Lord Proprietor of the Province of New York, appointed Dongan as Vice-admiral in the Navy and provincial governor (1683–1688) to replace Edmund Andros "Dongan's long service in the French army had made him conversant with the French character and diplomacy and his campaigns in the Low Countries had given him a knowledge of the Dutch language." James also granted him an estate on Staten Island. The estate eventually became the town of Castleton; later, another section of the island was named Dongan Hills in honour of Dongan.

Dongan landed in Boston on 10 August 1683, crossed Long Island Sound, and passed through the small settlements in the eastern part of the island and he made his way to Fort James, arriving on 25 August. In October, Rev. Henry Selyns reported to the Amsterdam Classis, "...our new governor has at last arrived. His excellency is a person of knowledge refinement and modesty. I have had the pleasure of receiving a call from him and I have the privilege of calling on him whenever I desire."    

At the time of his appointment, the province was bankrupt and in a state of rebellion. Dongan was able to restore order and stability. On 14 October 1683, he convened the first-ever representative assembly in New York history at Fort James. The New York General Assembly, under the wise supervision of Dongan, passed an act entitled "A Charter of Liberties". It decreed that the supreme legislative power under the Duke of York shall reside in a governor, council, and the people convened in general assembly; conferred upon the members of the assembly rights and privileges making them a body coequal to and independent of the Parliament of England; established town, county, and general courts of justice; solemnly proclaimed the right of religious liberty; and passed acts enunciating certain constitutional liberties, e.g. taxes could be levied only by the people met in general assembly; right of suffrage; and no martial law or quartering of the soldiers without the consent of the inhabitants.

Dongan soon incurred the ill will of William Penn who was negotiating with the Iroquois for the purchase of the upper Susquehanna Valley. Dongan went to Albany, and declared that the sale would be "prejudicial to His Highness's interests". The Cayugas sold the property to New York with the consent of the Mohawk. Years later, when back in England and in favour at the Court of James II, Penn would use his influence to prejudice the king against Dongan.   

On 22 July 1686, Governor Dongan granted Albany a municipal charter. Almost identical in form to the charter awarded to New York City just three months earlier, the Albany charter was the result of negotiations conducted between royal officials and Robert Livingston the Elder  and Pieter Schuyler. The charter incorporated the city of Albany, establishing a separate municipal entity in the midst of the Van Rensselaer Manor.

Dongan established the boundary lines of the province by settling disputes with Connecticut on the East, with the French Governor of Canada on the North, and with Pennsylvania on the South, thus marking out the present limits of New York State. Regarding Canada, it was necessary to secure the friendship of the Iroquois. This became the subject of a deal of correspondence between Dongan and his counterpart to the north. "...[C]ertainly our rum doth as little hurt as your brandy and in the opinion of Christians is much more wholesome." Dongan journeyed to the Iroquois nation, and convened assembly with them, garnering support, and approval. He was called "corlur" by the Iroquois Chief, a term from the Irish language "Coṁairleoir," used in Parliamentary deference to the Speaker, and meaning "advisor."

James later consolidated the colonial governments of New York, New Jersey and the United Colonies of New England into the Dominion of New England and appointed Edmund Andros, the former Governor-General of New York, as Governor-General. Dongan transferred his governorship back to Andros on 11 August 1688. He retired to his Staten Island estate, where he remained until July 1689. During Leisler's Rebellion, fearing for his safety, he fled back to England.

Dongan was to execute land grants establishing several towns throughout New York State including the eastern Long Island communities of East Hampton and Southampton.  These grants, called the Dongan Patents, set up Town Trustees as the governing bodies with a mission of managing common land for common good. The Dongan Patents still hold force of law and have been upheld by the US Supreme Court with the Trustees—rather than town boards, city councils or even the State Legislature—still managing much of the common land in the state.

In 1698, his brother William Dongan, 1st Earl of Limerick, died without issue. Because of his service to the Crown as a military officer and as provincial governor, he was granted his brother's title in the Peerage of Ireland and a portion of his brother's forfeited estates by a special Act of Parliament for his relief. In 1709, Lord Limerick sold his 2,300-acre property at Celbridge to William Conolly.

Death
He lived in London for the last years of his life and died on 14 December 1715 at the age of 81. He was buried in Old St. Pancras churchyard, London.

References

 – L to M

Ref.  John Dongan of Dublin, An Elizabethan Gentleman And His Family.  Baltimore; Gateway Press, 1996.
Pages 141 – 151 reference Gov. Thomas Dongan.

External links
Thomas Dongan and the East Hampton Patent
Thomas Dongan in 'Miscellaneous Limerick People' file at Limerick City Library, Ireland

Governors of the Province of New York
People from Celbridge
People from Staten Island
Politicians from County Kildare
1634 births
1715 deaths
Kingdom of Ireland emigrants to the Thirteen Colonies
Irish colonial officials
Irish soldiers
Soldiers of the Tangier Garrison
Members of the Irish House of Lords
2